Stephanie Thomas is an American politician currently serving as the Secretary of the State of Connecticut. She previously served as a state representative representing the 143rd District in the Connecticut House of Representatives. A member of the Democratic Party, Thomas originally ran for the 143rd seat in 2018 against incumbent Republican Gail Lavielle. Thomas ran again in 2020, defeating Republican challenger Patricia Zuccaro. In the House, Thomas served as a member of both the Commerce and Transportation Committees, as well as the Government Administration and Elections Committee.

Thomas earned a bachelor's degree in sociology from New York University and a master's degree in nonprofit management from The New School.

References

External links
 Government website
 Campaign website

 

 

21st-century African-American politicians
21st-century African-American women
21st-century American politicians
21st-century American women politicians
African-American state legislators in Connecticut
African-American women in politics
Living people
Democratic Party members of the Connecticut House of Representatives
New York University alumni
Secretaries of the State of Connecticut
The New School alumni
Women state legislators in Connecticut
Year of birth missing (living people)